Desert festival may refer to:
 Burning Man in the United States
 Dubai Desert Rock Festival in the United Arab Emirates
 Festival in the Desert in Mali
 International Festival of the Sahara in Tunisia
 Rajasthan desert festival in Rajasthan, India